Hochberg may refer to:

Mountains
 Hochberg (Chiemgau), Bavaria, Germany
 Hochberg (Dahn), a hill in the Palatinate Forest, Germany
 Hochberg (Haardt), a mountain in the Palatinate Forest, Germany
 Hochberg (Lower Bavaria), Germany
 Hochberg (Swabian Jura), a mountain of the Swabian Alps, Baden-Württemberg, Germany

Places
 Höchberg, a municipality in the district of Würzburg in Bavaria, Germany
 Hochberg, a borough of Remseck in Ludwigsburg in Baden-Württemberg
 Hochberg (Bad Saulgau), a district of Bad Saulgau in Sigmaringen in Baden-Württemberg
 Hochberg (Chiemgau), a district of Traunstein in Bavaria, Germany

People

People
 Margraves of Baden-Hochberg (formerly Baden-Hachberg)
 Reichsgrafen of Hochberg-Fürstenstein at castle Fürstenstein near Wałbrzych (Waldenburg) in Silesia, since 1848 Duke of Pless
 Count Leopold of Hochberg, later Leopold, Grand Duke of Baden
 Countess Marie of Hochberg, nobility

People surnamed Hochberg
 Adam Hochberg, radio correspondent for National Public Radio
 Alexander Hochberg, German aristocrat
 Audrey Hochberg (1933–2005), New York politician
 Burt Hochberg (1933–2006), American expert on chess and other games and puzzles
 Faith S. Hochberg (born 1950), United States federal judge
 Fred Hochberg (born 1952), American academic and political administrator
 Isidore Hochberg, birth name of Yip Harburg (1896–1981), American songwriter
 Karl Höchberg (1853–1885), German social-reformist writer, publisher and economist
 Louise Caroline of Hochberg (1768–1820), second wife of Margrave and, later, Grand Duke Charles Frederick of Baden
 Michael Hochberg (born 1980), American physicist
 Michael E. Hochberg, American population biologist
 Netanel Hochberg (died 1983), Israeli agronomist
 Scott Hochberg (born 1953), member of the Texas House of Representatives

German-language surnames